Drasteria maculosa is a moth of the family Erebidae. It is found in North America, where it has been recorded from Nevada and California.

The wingspan is about 32 mm. Adults have been recorded on wing in August.

References

Drasteria
Moths described in 1870
Moths of North America